Jon Wiener (born May 16, 1944) is an American historian and journalist based in Los Angeles, California. His most recent book is Set the Night on Fire: L.A. in the Sixties, a Los Angeles Times bestseller co-authored by Mike Davis. He waged a 25-year legal battle to win the release of the FBI's files on John Lennon. Wiener played a key role in efforts to expose the surveillance, as well as the behind-the-scenes battling between the government and the former Beatle, and is an expert on the FBI-versus-Lennon controversy. A professor emeritus of United States history at the University of California, Irvine and host of The Nations weekly podcast, Start Making Sense, he is also a contributing editor to the progressive political weekly magazine The Nation. He also hosts a weekly radio program in Los Angeles.

Set the Night on Fire (2020) is a movement history of Los Angeles. The backbone of the book is the story of the civil rights, Black power and Chicano movements, as well as the anti-war movement, gay liberation and women's liberation and the battles between young people and the LAPD on Sunset Strip and at Venice Beach. The counterculture provides another focus—the Ash Grove folk music club, the LA Free Press, KPFK radio and the Free Clinic.

Early life
Wiener was born in Saint Paul, Minnesota,  the son of Gladys (née Aronsohn) and Dr. Daniel Wiener. He graduated from Central High School and then attended Princeton University where he founded a chapter of the Students for a Democratic Society to protest the Vietnam War. He received a bachelor's degree from Princeton in 1966, and earned a Ph.D. from Harvard, where he worked with Barrington Moore, Jr. and Michael Walzer, and also wrote for the underground paper The Old Mole.

Career

Academic career

At the University of California, Irvine, Wiener taught history courses on American politics and the Cold War. His scholarly works have been published in The American Historical Review, The Journal of American History, Radical History Review, and Past & Present. He led students on visits to the Nixon Library.

Journalism and political commentary

Since 1984, Wiener has been a contributing editor for The Nation magazine, where he has written about diverse topics including campus issues, intellectual controversies, and southern California politics. His writing has also appeared in The Guardian, The New York Times Magazine, The New Republic, and the Los Angeles Times. On Wiener's weekly podcast for The Nation, “Start Making Sense,” and on his weekly radio program for Los Angeles radio station KPFK 90.7 FM, his guests have included Gail Collins, Jane Mayer, Gore Vidal, Barbara Ehrenreich, Frank Rich, Seymour Hersh, Henry Louis Gates, Stacey Abrams, Bill McKibben, Chris Hayes, and Terry Gross.  He's also interviewed novelists Margaret Atwood, Rachel Kushner, John Banville, Elmore Leonard, Viet Thanh Nguyen, and Joan Didion.

In his journalism, Wiener, writing in the Los Angeles Times at the beginning of 2020, correctly predicted that 2020 would be “The Worst Year of Trump’s Life.” He interviewed Chinese dissident artist Ai Wei Wei about the international refugee crisis—the subject of Ai's film “Human Flow.” He interviewed Georgia's voting rights organizer Stacey Abrams about her work. And he spoke with the award-winning novelist Margaret Atwood about “the shocking relevance of “The Handmaid’s Tale.” He also has written on historical topics – on the 50th anniversary of the My Lai Massacre, he wrote about the “forgotten hero” who “stopped the My Lai massacre,” quoting from his interview for KPFK with army helicopter pilot Hugh Thompson. And he wrote for the New York Times Book Review about how the sixties are remembered in America. While Wiener is perhaps best known for his battling to expose the FBI's surveillance of John Lennon, he also was instrumental in getting the FBI to release documents about its surveillance of comedian Groucho Marx.

Wiener and the Lennon FBI files

Background

The legal battle between Wiener and the United States government was waged over two and a half decades, and has been examined by other historians. In the late sixties, many young Americans became opposed to the Vietnam War, and John Lennon became an antiwar advocate who made then-president Richard Nixon nervous about his reelection prospects in 1972. The consensus view is that Nixon asked the FBI to begin surveillance of Lennon, possibly after Lennon went to New York on a visa and met up with radical anti-war activists. Government surveillance of Lennon had been extensive, although there was no documentary evidence of wiretapping, and lasted about 11 months.

The attempt to deport Lennon
The Immigration and Naturalization Service, acting on a suggestion from Senator Strom Thurmond, and probably at the behest of Richard Nixon, ordered Lennon to be deported in the spring of 1972. According to Wiener's account, the key issue for the Nixon administration was that Lennon had been talking to anti-war leaders about a "tour that would combine rock music with anti-war organizing and voter registration," possibly as a way to court first-time eighteen-year-old voters, who were believed to have a tendency to vote for the Democratic party.

Reporter Adam Cohen writing in 2006 in The New York Times agreed that the FBI surveillance of Lennon had been motivated not only by antiwar concerns but by concerns of a political nature. According to Cohen, what was most revealing was that the timing of these events suggested there was an underlying political motivation behind the surveillance and deportation proceedings. Numerous friends, including folk singer Bob Dylan, wrote letters to the Immigration and Naturalization Service advocating that Lennon should be allowed to stay. On December 8, 1972, after Nixon's reelection in November, the FBI closed its investigation of Lennon, partially because Lennon has shown "inactivity in Revolutionary Activities." According to Wiener, the FBI had succeeded in "neutralizing" Lennon's opposition to Nixon's reelection. John Lennon was murdered in December 1980.

Wiener vs. the FBI

In 1981, while conducting research for a book about John Lennon, Wiener learned of the FBI surveillance, and that there were either 281 or 400 pages of files on the ex-Beatle. Wiener requested the release of the FBI's files on Lennon by citing the Freedom of Information Act. The FBI refused to release two-thirds or 199 pages of the files on the grounds that they contained "national security" information. The pages that were released were heavily blacked out with magic marker, or redacted.

In 1983, Wiener sued the FBI under the Freedom of Information Act with assistance from the ACLU of Southern California, including attorneys Dan Marmalefsky of Morrison & Foerster and Mark Rosenbaum of the ACLU. In response, the FBI turned over some documents, but withheld others claiming they contained "national security information provided by a foreign government under an explicit promise of confidentiality" and added that releasing the documents could lead to "military retaliation against the United States."

Wiener chronicled much of his frustration with getting documents in his 1984 book Come Together including many "Orwellian moments" during the "tortoise-like progress" of the lawyers. While Wiener lost many of the early "skirmishes", a turning point came in 1991 when the 9th Circuit appeals court ruled in his favor, and declared that the FBI had failed to provide "adequate grounds" to keep the data secret. As a result, the FBI had to keep filing affidavits which had "sufficient detail" which allowed Wiener to keep advocating for their release, and for judges to "intelligently judge" the contest, according to several reports. Then justice department lawyer John Roberts, who later became Chief Justice of the Supreme Court, appealed the decision, but the Supreme Court at the time sided with Wiener and the ACLU.

The case of Wiener v FBI escalated over many years. A settlement with the FBI was reached in 1997 before the case could be heard before the Supreme Court, and most documents except ten were released to Wiener as part of the agreement. According to Wiener, the government paid $204,000 in court costs and attorney fees. The justice department lawyers retained ten documents under the national security proviso of the FOIA. In 2006, the final eight or ten documents of Lennon's file were released. According to Wiener, the ten pages revealed there had been contacts between Lennon and leftist and anti-war groups in London in the early 1970s but that there had been no signs that government officials saw Lennon as a serious threat, and only regarded solicitation of funds for a "left-wing bookshop and reading room in London" but that Lennon did not provide any funds for this purpose. Wiener wrote:

Wiener expressed amazement that so much of the information had been withheld:

Chronicling the case
Wiener wrote about his legal battles in his book, Gimme Some Truth: The John Lennon FBI Files, published by the University of California Press in 2000. The book includes copies of 100 key documents from the Lennon file, including "lengthy reports by confidential informants detailing the daily lives of anti-war activists, memos to the White House, transcripts of TV shows on which Lennon appeared, and a proposal that Lennon be arrested by local police on drug charges." He also wrote about the case and its significance for The Guardian, The Nation, the L.A. Times, and The New Republic.

Wiener's work provided the basis for the 2006 documentary The U.S. vs. John Lennon. Wiener served as a historical consultant to the production and also appears in the film. He also appears in the documentary LENNONYC, which aired on the PBS show "American Masters" in 2010. He was interviewed about the Lennon FBI Files by Terry Gross on the NPR program "Fresh Air." ACLU attorney Mark Rosenbaum said that the Wiener v FBI case revealed "government paranoia at a pathological level and an attempt to shield executive branch abuse of civil liberties under the rubric of national security."

Books
Wiener is the author of seven books. In addition to his co-authored 2020 book Set the Night on Fire: L.A. in the Sixties, Wiener also wrote Historians in Trouble: Plagiarism, Fraud and Power in the Ivory Tower. he examined various academic scandals and concluded that media spectacles end careers only when powerful, usually right-leaning external groups demand punishment. He also edited and wrote the introduction to Conspiracy in the Streets: The Extraordinary Trial of the Chicago Seven which included an abridged transcript of the 1968 Chicago Conspiracy trial; in that trial, Bobby Seale, Abbie Hoffman, Jerry Rubin, Dave Dellinger and others faced charges stemming from anti-war demonstrations at the Democratic National Convention, and witnesses included Timothy Leary, Norman Mailer, Arlo Guthrie, and Allen Ginsberg; the book includes an afterword by defendant Tom Hayden and drawings by Jules Feiffer. Wiener's earlier book How We Forgot the Cold War: A Historical Journey across America, based on his visits to Cold War monuments, museums, and memorials, emphasizes popular skepticism about America's victory.

Critical reaction
Reactions by critics to Wiener's writings has been varied. Kirkus Reviews called Set the Night on Fire: L.A. in the Sixties "a richly detailed portrait of a city that seethed with rebellious energy." The reviewer for the Los Angeles Times described it as "a dense, detailed read" that was “authoritative and impressive.” The LA Review of Books called it "a monumental history of rebellion and resistance." Some reviewers found problems with the book – Publishers Weekly said it was an "overstuffed and often disjointed account" but declared that "Davis and Wiener write with passion and deep knowledge,” and concluded that the book was “an indispensable portrait of an unexplored chapter in history." On April 22, 2020, in The Guardians Book of the Day, Ben Ehrenreich called it "a vital primer in resistance, a gift to the future from the past." 

Among his earlier books, the New York Times Book Review wrote that Wiener's book Come Together: John Lennon in His Time "stands out as one of the few books that don't want to deify, dish the dirt about or otherwise exploit the slain former Beatle." A second review of this book criticized Wiener's perspective for being "tunnel-visioned". He has been criticized by Andrew Sullivan of The Atlantic. Wiener's Gimme Some Truth received positive reviews in The Washington Post, London Independent, and the Christian Science Monitor. A review of Wiener's book Historians in Trouble: Plagiarism, Fraud, and Politics in the Ivory Tower criticized Wiener for having a left-leaning bias. One reviewer described Wiener's Gimme Some Truth book as "sobering".

Selected bibliography
 Set the Night on Fire: L.A. in the Sixties, by Jon Wiener and Mike Davis, Verso (publisher), April 14, 2020, 
 I Told You So: Gore Vidal Talks Politics—interviews with Gore Vidal
 How We Forgot the Cold War: A Historical Journey across America.  Berkeley: University of California Press, 2012.  .
 Conspiracy in the Streets: The Extraordinary Trial of the Chicago Seven.  Edited with an introduction by Jon Wiener; afterword by Tom Hayden; drawings by Jules Feiffer. New York: The New Press, 2006.  
 Historians in Trouble: Plagiarism, Fraud, and Politics in the Ivory Tower .  New York: The New Press, 2005. 
 Gimme Some Truth: The John Lennon FBI Files Berkeley: University of California Press, 2000.  
 Professors, Politics and Pop. London and New York: Verso Books, 1991. 
 Come Together: John Lennon in his Time New York: Random House, 1984.  
 Social Origins of the New South: Alabama, 1865-1885. Baton Rouge: Louisiana State University Press, 1978.  
 "The Footnote Fetish." Telos 31 (Spring 1977). New York: Telos Press.

See also
 John Lennon
 Give Peace a Chance
 Federal Bureau of Investigation
Sean O'Hagan in The Guardian
Kevin McCaighy in Socialist Review

References

External links
Jon Wiener website: On the radio and in print
Biography at The Nation
Faculty website at University of California, Irvine

The John Lennon FBI files website
"Probing the FBI's Files on John Lennon" Fresh Air with Terry Gross: interview with Jon Wiener
"Author Says The Chicago 7 Trial Reflected 'All The Conflicts In America'" Fresh Air with Terry Gross: interview with Jon Wiener

American activist journalists
University of California, Irvine faculty
Writers from Saint Paul, Minnesota
Princeton University alumni
Harvard University alumni
Radio personalities from Los Angeles
American Civil Liberties Union people
American democracy activists
Living people
1944 births
American columnists
American political activists
Historians of the United States
American male non-fiction writers
Activists from California